Nefeli Mousoura is a Greek classical pianist.

Biography 

Nefeli's repertoire focuses on the First Viennese School and the Romantic music of the 19th century.

Her appearances include concerts and master classes in China, Russia, United States and Europe.

She has graduated with a Bachelor of Arts and a Master of Arts in Piano Solo Performance with highest Distinction from the Mozarteum University of Salzburg, after receiving scholarships from the Onassis Foundation and the Gina Bachauer International Music Association. Among her teachers were Imre Rohmann and Rolf Plagge. She also has a Bachelor of Arts in Musicology from the National and Kapodistrian University of Athens. She began piano lessons at age four.

Prizes and awards 

 2005, Competition of Greek Ministry of Culture: First Prize
 2009, Academy of Athens Piano Prize, which has been a subject on major Greek news media
 2010, Andros International Piano Competition: First Prize
 2016, Campillos International Piano Competition: Third Prize, which has been a subject on major Greek news media

Notable Performances 

 2016, Live recital for the Third Programme of the Hellenic Broadcasting Corporation
 2017, Tribute recital to Rena Kyriakou at the Athens Concert Hall
 2018, National TV broadcast of a concerto performance with the Greek National Symphony Orchestra for the Hellenic Radio and Television 2 of the Hellenic Broadcasting Corporation aired also in 2019 
 2018, Tribute recital to Claude Debussy at the Athens Conservatory’s Aris Garoufalis Concert Hall
 2019, Recital given in Greece to ambassadors and other members of the diplomatic missions of Austria, China, the Czech Republic, Georgia, Germany, Italy, Japan, Kazakhstan, Luxembourg, Moldova, Montenegro, the Palestinian Authority, Romania and Ukraine
2019, Debut recital at the prestigious Salzburger Festspiele. Her participation in the Festival has been a subject of major Greek media, including an announcement by the Greek Newspaper Το Πρώτο Θέμα, a live interview by the Greek TV network ANT1 and a review by the Greek Newspaper Τα Νέα, which was also featured at the printed newspaper headlines

News Coverage 

 2014, Winner of Gina Bachauer Prize
2014, Profile presentation from the Greek online magazine eirinika.gr
 2016, Profile presentation from the Greek Newspaper Το Πρώτο Θέμα
 2018, Master classes in Moscow featured at Russian TV
 2019, Interview for the Greek Newspaper Τα Νέα
 2019, Interview for the Greek Newspaper ΠΑΛΜΟΣ
 2019, Review of a recital at Athens Concert Hall, from the Greek Magazine ΑΘΗΝΟΡΑΜΑ
 2019, Review of a concerto performance at Olympia Theater, from the Greek Magazine ΑΘΗΝΟΡΑΜΑ

References

External links 

 

Living people
Greek women pianists
Greek classical pianists
Women classical pianists
21st-century classical pianists
Year of birth missing (living people)
21st-century women pianists